Ferdowsi  street is a  street in downtown of Tabriz, Iran connecting Bazaar alley to Imam Ave in the vicinity of Arg. It is well known for its historical architecture, hostels and shops. It is located in the Bazaar suburb. The street is include numerous shops for industrial tools.
خیابان فردوسی خیابانی در مرکز شهر تبریز است که کوچه بازار را به خیابان امام در مجاورت ارگ وصل می‌کند. این شهر به دلیل معماری تاریخی، هاستل ها و فروشگاه هایش به خوبی شناخته شده است. در حومه بازار واقع شده است. این خیابان شامل مغازه های متعددی برای ابزارآلات صنعتی است

See also
 Tarbiyat street
 Shahnaz street

References 
  Editorial Board, East Azarbaijan Geography, Iranian Ministry of Education, 2000 (High School Text Book in Persian)
 http://www.eachto.ir

Tabriz
Architecture in Iran
Streets in Iran
Transportation in East Azerbaijan Province